The America was built by the Motor Car Co. of America, New York City, New York in 1911. It was available in five models, all with an L-head 4-cylinder engine giving off . The torpedo, capable of holding two passengers, had a long, low silhouette and a rounded aft-section. Unusually, these cars had an auxiliary  fuel tank. It is claimed that this company was later associated with McIntyre Automobile.

See also
List of defunct automobile manufacturers of the United States

References
^ G.Marshall Naul, "America (i)", in G.N. Georgano, ed., The Complete Encyclopedia of Motorcars 1885-1968  (New York: E.P. Dutton and Co., 1974), pp. 41.

1910s cars
Defunct motor vehicle manufacturers of the United States
Motor vehicle manufacturers based in New York (state)